Alfonso R. Bernard, Sr. (born August 10, 1953) is the pastor of the Christian Cultural Center Megachurch in Brooklyn, New York. In November 1979, Bernard left a career in banking to start a ministry.  What started as a small storefront church in Williamsburg, Brooklyn has grown into a 37,000+ member church that sits on an -acre campus in Brooklyn, New York. He is founder and CEO of the Christian Cultural Center.

Early life and education
Bernard was born in Panama, the son of an Afro-Panamanian mother and a Castilian Spaniard father. His father disowned him and in 1957, he and his mother moved to the Bedford-Stuyvesant neighborhood of Brooklyn, New York. As part of the 1960s desegregation movement in the public school system, he was bused to school in Ridgewood, Queens and then attended Grover Cleveland High School. Bernard worked after school in the garment district pushing racks for $2.00 per hour to assist his mother in their single parent household. He landed a clerk position with Bankers Trust Company during his senior year of high school.

Bernard has a master's degree in urban studies and a Master of Divinity from Alliance Theological Seminary. He has been awarded an honorary Doctor of Divinity degree from Wagner College and an honorary Doctor of Divinity degree from Nyack College/Alliance Theological Seminary.

Career

Prior to becoming a born again Christian in January 1975, Bernard was a part of the Muslim American movement. In 1978 he and his wife, Karen, started a bible study in the kitchen of their Brooklyn railroad apartment. Bernard left his 10-year banking career in 1979 to go into ministry full-time, and they rented a small storefront in Greenpoint, Brooklyn. Later that year Household of Faith Ministries was incorporated. In 1988, Household of Faith turned an abandoned Brooklyn supermarket into a 1000-seat sanctuary, naming it Christian Life Center in June 1989, with a membership of 625. In 1995 they purchased a vacant lot adjacent to Starrett City and the church moved into its new home on December 31, 2000. The 6.5-acre (26,000 m2) sanctuary and conference center also includes a chapel, bookstore, television production facilities and youth center.

During the campaigning for the 2016 presidential elections, Bernard joined the board of Donald Trump's "Evangelical Executive Advisory Board". The purpose of the board was to "provide advisory support to Mr. Trump on those issues important to Evangelicals and other people of the faith in America,” the campaign said in a statement. Bernard then stepped down in 2017 quoting a "deepening conflict in values between myself and the administration."

Personal life 
Bernard is married to his wife Karen since 1972. Bernard and Karen met in high school in East New York, when he was 15 and she 16. In an interview, he revealed that they were once headed for divorce because of some decisions that he had made and that he had made his "ministry his mistress". They have 7 sons and several grandchildren together.

His eldest son, Alfonso R. Bernard Jr., died from an asthma attack on 4 February 2015 at the age of 39 and is survived by his wife Janel and four children.

Published works
Happiness Is (Touchstone, 2011)
Four Things Women Want from a Man (Howard Books, 2017)

References

External links
 Christian Cultural Center's official website
 A.R. Bernard's official website
 "The Influentials: Religion", New York Magazine

American Christian clergy
People from Bedford–Stuyvesant, Brooklyn
Panamanian emigrants to the United States
1953 births
Living people